Zagyuri is a community in Tamale Metropolitan District in the Northern Region of Ghana. Tamale School of Hygiene is situated at this location. It is located along the Tamale-Bolgatanga trunk road. Zagyuri is a large populated community and one of the finest modern designed structures located in the new settlement.
Zagyuri Anglican, Miskaya School, Ambition and many other schools are local schools. A spinal clinic is also located here.

See also

Kanvili
Jisonaayili

References 

Communities in Ghana
Suburbs of Tamale, Ghana